The Kuwait Science and Natural History Museum is a museum in Safat,  Kuwait City, Kuwait, located on Abdullah Al-Mobarak Street. The museum is operated and managed by the Ministry of Education.

History and profile
The museum was opened in 1972. It explores the country's technological and scientific progress and it contains artifacts and demonstrations of the Petroleum industry in Kuwait. It is a member of the International Council of Museums.

The museum is organized in the following departments: Natural history department, space science department, planetarium, electronics department, machinery department, zoology department, aviation department and a health hall.

References

External links
 Official website

1972 establishments in Kuwait
Museums established in 1972
Buildings and structures in Kuwait City
Museums in Kuwait